Execution in Autumn is a 1972 Taiwanese drama film directed by Hsing Lee.
 The film was selected as the Taiwanese entry for the Best Foreign Language Film at the 45th Academy Awards, but was not accepted as a nominee.

Cast
 Hui Lou Chen as Thief
 Shao Ching Chou as Hsing Tao
 Fu Bihui as Liao Nai-nai
 Su Han as Pei Hsun
 Ko Hsiang-ting as Stockade Governor Lao Tao
 Hsiang Li as Chan Tao
 Ou Wei as Wei Pang
 Tang Pao-yun as Lien Erh
 Tsui Fu-sheng as County Magistrate

See also
 List of submissions to the 45th Academy Awards for Best Foreign Language Film
 List of Taiwanese submissions for the Academy Award for Best Foreign Language Film

References

External links
 

1972 films
1972 drama films
1970s Mandarin-language films
Films directed by Li Hsing
Films with screenplays by Chang Yung-hsiang
Films set in Imperial China
Taiwanese drama films